Veh Mihr Shapur (died 442) was a Sasanian military officer and the first Marzban of Armenia from 428 to 442. Veh Mihr Shapur died in 442 and was succeeded by Vasak of Syunik.

Sources
 

5th-century Iranian people
Sasanian governors of Armenia
Year of birth unknown
442 deaths
Generals of Yazdegerd II